The Battle Royale was an electronic dance group from Minneapolis, Minnesota signed to Afternoon Records. The group disbanded and its members are currently working on other projects. John Pelant and Mark Ritsema are currently involved with Night Moves, and Grace Fiddler with One for the Team.

Former members
 Grace Fiddler (vocals, bass)
 John Pelant (vocals, guitar)
 Mark Ritsema (vocals, synth)
 Sam Robertson (vocals, organ)

Discography

 Sparkle Dust Fantasy, (Album, 2006)
 Wake Up, Thunderbabe, (Album, 2007)

External links
 The Battle Royale Official Site
 The Battle Royale on MySpace
 The Battle Royale on IODA PROMONET

Indie rock musical groups from Minnesota